The 13th Space Warning Squadron (13SWS) is a missile warning unit assigned to the United States Space Force and located at Clear Space Force Station 5 miles (8 km) south of Anderson, Alaska

Mission
The primary mission of the 13th SWS is to provide early warning of intercontinental ballistic missiles (ICBMs) and submarine-launched ballistic missiles (SLBMs) launches to the Missile Warning Center at North American Aerospace Defense Command. The secondary mission of the 13SWS is to provide space surveillance data on orbiting objects to the Space Control Center also located in the Cheyenne Mountain Complex.

History
The 13th SWS is controlled by the Missile Warning Center, part of the NORAD, and by the Space Control Center, part of United States Strategic Command. Both agencies are located at the Cheyenne Mountain Operations Center in Colorado. Clear accomplishes these missions using the Solid State Phased Array Radar System (SSPARS) radar.  Clear's radar was originally located at El Dorado Air Station, Texas as part of the PAVE PAWS program and was only recently transplanted to Alaska to replace the US' last mechanical missile warning radar site.

Assignments

Major Command
Air Force Space Command (1 May 1983–Present)
Strategic Air Command (1 December 1979 – 1 May 1983)
Air Defense Command (later Aerospace Defense Command) (1 November 1966 – 1 December 1979)

Wing/Group
21st Space Wing (15 May 1992–Present)
1st Space Wing (1 May 1983 – 15 May 1992)
71st Missile Warning Wing (1 January 1967-???)

Previous designations
13th Space Warning Squadron (15 May 1992–Present)
13th Missile Warning Squadron (1 November 1966 – 15 May 1992)

Bases stationed
Clear Missile Early Warning Station (later Clear AFS, Clear AS, and Clear Space Force Station), Alaska (1 January 1967–Present)

Decorations
Air Force Outstanding Unit Award 
1 October 1997 – 30 September 1999
1 January 1998 – 31 December 1998
1 October 1995 – 30 September 1997
1 May 1983 – 30 April 1984
1 July 1971 – 30 June 1973
1 June 1968 – 31 May 1970

List of commanders

 Lt Col Stephen Whiting, July 2004–July 2005
 Lt Col Torrence W. Saxe, June 2011–March 2012
 Lt Col Michael Sowa, ~2010
 Lt Col Matthew A. Morand, June 2012–May 2013
 Lt Col Jason Burch, June 2015
 Lt Col Joel Lane, 13 June 2017
 Lt Col Jeffrey Rutherford, 13 June 2018
 Lt Col Shawn P. Lee, 20 June 2019
 Lt Col Shahn Rashid, 2 July 2020
 Lt Col William Hassey, June 2021
 Lt Col Christopher Castle, 16 June 2022

References

External links
 Global's Clear AFS website

Squadrons of the United States Space Force
Military units and formations in Alaska